Moshe David Tendler (August 7, 1926September 28, 2021) was an American rabbi, professor of biology and expert in medical ethics. He served as chairman of the biology department at Yeshiva University.

Biography
Moshe David Tendler was born in the Lower East Side neighborhood of New York City on August 7, 1926. He received his B.A. degree from New York University in 1947 and a master's degree in 1950. He was ordained at the Yeshiva University-affiliated Rabbi Isaac Elchanan Theological Seminary (RIETS) in 1949, and earned a Ph.D. in microbiology from Columbia University in 1957.

In 1951, Yeshiva University's Samuel Belkin encouraged Tendler to lead the Great Neck Synagogue for one year as an intern, thereby becoming the community's first rabbi. He later became the long-time rabbi of the Community Synagogue of Monsey, New York. 

Tendler served as a senior rosh yeshiva (dean) at RIETS, and the Rabbi Isaac and Bella Tendler Professor of Jewish Medical Ethics and Professor of Biology at Yeshiva College. He was noted as an expert on Jewish medical ethics and their relationship to halakha (Jewish law).

Tendler was the son-in-law of Moshe Feinstein, a world-renowned posek. Some of Feinstein's "Iggerot Mosheh" responsa are addressed to his son-in-law. His wife, Shifra, died in October 2007. Tendler died on September 28, 2021, in Rochelle Park, New Jersey.

Medical ethics

Tendler has written and lectured widely on medical ethics. He translated various medical oriented responsa of Feinstein into English, even though Feinstein expressly forbade such translations. Tendler advocates the theory that complete and irreversible cessation of function of the entire brain renders a person "physiologically decapitated", and is considered legally dead according to Jewish law. Tendler asserts that once organ donation has been deemed permissible under the given conditions, it is indeed mandatory, falling under the rubric of the legal obligation of Jews to preserve the lives of others. In addition, Tendler has written extensively on euthanasia, infertility, end of life issues, organ donation, and brit milah (Jewish circumcision). Tendler has been a strong advocate for the use of a tube when performing metzitzah, suction of blood during circumcision. Serving on an RCA panel on stem cell research, Tendler expressed respectful disagreement with the Bush administration's position.

Tendler was the posek for the Association of Orthodox Jewish Scientists and its past president.

Opinions
Tendler voiced his objection to the tactics employed by the New York divorce coercion gang, an outfit of rabbis that utilized kidnapping, and sometimes torture, to force Jewish men to grant their wives religious divorces, saying "The idea that a beth din can issue an order for coercion is baloney, a hoax." While conceding that he had had previous dealings with Mendel Epstein, a leader of that group, Tendler nevertheless characterized him as being "unreliable". Regarding Martin Wolmark, another member of that group, Tendler stated, "He's a very intelligent fellow, and he's American. I can't imagine him getting involved in such a dirty business." Epstein was later convicted of conspiracy to commit kidnapping, and Wolmark was convicted of conspiracy to commit extortion.

Published works

Articles
So One May Live - On the separation of Siamese twins.
Dental Emergencies on the Sabbath written with Dr. Fred Rosner.
Halakhic death means brain death - Explaining Tendler's position on the Jewish definition of death.
Rav Moshe on Organ donation - Tendler's analysis of Moshe Feinstein's positions on organ donation.
Molecular Genetics, Evolution, and Torah Principles - written with Dr. John Loike.
How Should a Torah-Observant High School Biology Teacher Teach the Origin and Diversity of Species? - The Sixth Miami International Conference on Torah & Science, Excerpts of the Panel Discussion, December 13, 2005
Erev Pesach that occurs on Shabbos

Books
Pardes Rimonim: A Marriage Manual for the Jewish Family. KTAV, 1988. .
 Practical Medical Halachah.  Co-author: Fred Rosner, Jason Aronson, 1997. .
Responsa of Rav Moshe Feinstein: Translation and Commentary KTAV, 1996.

References

External links
Tendler's YU biography

1926 births
2021 deaths
Modern Orthodox rabbis
American Orthodox rabbis
Bioethicists
People from Monsey, New York
Rabbi Isaac Elchanan Theological Seminary semikhah recipients
Yeshiva University rosh yeshivas
Jewish American scientists
Jewish scientists
Judaism and science
Writers about religion and science
New York University alumni